The 2013 Fort Wayne Summer Cash Spiel was held from August 16 to 18 at the Lutheran Health Sportscenter in Fort Wayne, Indiana. The women's event was held as part of the 2013–14 World Curling Tour, while both the men's and women's events were held as part of the 2013–14 Ontario Curling Tour. The men's event was being held in a triple-knockout format, while the women's event was being held in a round robin format. The purse for the men's event was US$3,000, while the purse for the women's event was US$6,000.

Men

Teams
The teams are listed as follows:

Knockout results

A Event

B Event

C Event

Playoffs

Women

Teams
The teams are listed as follows:

Round robin standings
Final round robin standings

Playoffs

References

External links

2013 in curling
Curling competitions in the United States
2013 in sports in Indiana
Curling in Indiana
2013 in American sports